In enzymology, a demethylmacrocin O-methyltransferase is an enzyme that catalyzes the chemical reaction

S-adenosyl-L-methionine + demethylmacrocin  S-adenosyl-L-homocysteine + macrocin

Thus, the two substrates of this enzyme are S-adenosyl methionine and demethylmacrocin, whereas its two products are S-adenosylhomocysteine and macrocin.

This enzyme belongs to the family of transferases, specifically those transferring one-carbon group methyltransferases.  The systematic name of this enzyme class is S-adenosyl-L-methionine:demethylmacrocin 2"'-O-methyltransferase. This enzyme is also called demethylmacrocin methyltransferase.  This enzyme participates in biosynthesis of 12-, 14- and 16-membered macrolides.

References

 

EC 2.1.1
Enzymes of unknown structure